Ian Penman (born 1959) is a British writer, music journalist and critic. He began his career as a writer for the NME in 1977, later contributing to various publications including Uncut, Sight & Sound, The Wire, The Face, and The Guardian. He is the author of Vital Signs: Music, Movies, and Other Manias (1998, Serpent's Tail).

Biography
Penman was born in Wiltshire, UK in 1959. He spent much of his childhood abroad in the Middle East and Africa, returning to Norfolk in 1970. Skipping higher education, Penman began writing for prominent British music magazine, the New Musical Express, in the autumn of 1977. Much of Penman's writing reflected his involvement in the nascent post-punk scene developing in London in the late 1970s.

Along with fellow NME writers such as Paul Morley and Barney Hoskyns, Penman soon developed an innovative style of music criticism dense with allusions to critical theory, philosophy, and other art mediums, and often experimental in its prose. With their increasingly esoteric writing standing in contrast to the magazine's more accessible competitors, such as Melody Maker, the NME soon began to alienate its readership; it is estimated that within several years, the magazine suffered the loss of half its circulation, in large part due to the new direction of Penman and his colleagues.

Penman continued writing intermittently for the NME until 1985, when the magazine began moving in an increasingly commercial direction. He began freelance work for various outlets, including The Face, Arena, the Sunday Times, The Independent, and the New Statesman. In the 1990s, he contributed to The Wire. In 1998, Penman published a compilation of his work entitled Vital Signs: Music, Movies, and Other Mania on Serpent's Tail to positive reviews. Julia Kenna reviewed the book for Rolling Stone, commenting, 
Full of contradictions and witty one-liners, Penman uses language as an art form, playing with puns, synonyms, repetition, and punctuation for added effect... Two decades of politics, music and pop culture with a whip-smart wit and wisdom that draws you in and doesn’t let go.
Penman contributed the text to the catalogue of photographer Robert Frank's exhibition Storylines (Tate Modern. 2004). In recent years, Penman has continued contributing to various publications, such as The Wire, City Journal and the London Review of Books, and is working on a book about Britain in the 1970s.

Influence
Penman's influence on subsequent music journalism, primarily in the UK, has been significant. He has been cited as an influence by range of writers and theorists, including Simon Reynolds, Kodwo Eshun,
and Mark Fisher. In addition, artists such as Simon Raymonde of Cocteau Twins have cited Penman's writing as an inspiration.

Books
Vital Signs: Music, Movies, and Other Manias. (1998, Serpent's Tail).
It Gets Me Home, This Curving Track (2019, Fitzcarraldo Editions)

References

External links
Ian Penman's Blogspot
Ian Penman chronology in Rock's Backpages
Ian Penman on Diamanda Galás
Announcement of It Gets Me Home, This Curving Track

1959 births
British music critics
Living people
NME writers
The Wire (magazine) writers
Writers from Wiltshire